The Great Santa Barbara Oil Slick is a live album by American fingerstyle guitarist and composer John Fahey, released posthumously in 2004.

History
The Great Santa Barbara Oil Slick consists of previously unreleased live recordings from two shows in 1968 and 1969. The majority comes from a February 1968 performance at The Matrix in San Francisco, CA. The other location is unknown.

The title track, not included on any of Fahey's '60s records, contains portions of "Requiem for Russell Blaine Cooper" and "Voice of the Turtle" that appeared on Requia and America respectively.

Reception

On its release in 2004, The Great Santa Barbara Oil Slick received positive reviews. Critic David Fricke, writing for Rolling Stone referred to Fahey's "sublime distention of traditional forms". Richie Unterberger called it "...a testament to Fahey's mastery of the tunes" and "a solid addition to the John Fahey canon". Referring to the time period of the live performance, Bill Meyer of Dusted Magazine writes "...no matter how much I admire Fahey’s determination to keep his creativity alive and appreciate some of what came out of that effort, I can’t get enough of this old stuff." and "... this is lovely music. “Requiem For Mississippi John Hurt” overflows with triumph and joy, the opening of “When The Catfish Is In Bloom” is so rich and regal you want to put your hand over your heart." Mark Richardson refers to "Catfish" as "[it] sounds about 200 years old and parts of it probably are, as references to marching spirituals slowly pile up into a ringing cluster of notes." Mojo's Andrew Male referred to it as "A strange guitarist at the top of his game."

Track listing
All songs by John Fahey unless otherwise noted.
 "Introduction" – 0:12
 "When the Springtime Comes Again" – 9:48
 "Joe Kirby Blues" – 3:45
 "Requiem for Mississippi John Hurt" – 4:19
 "When the Catfish Is in Bloom" – 7:56
 "Fahey Blows His Nose" – 0:46
 "Lion (Intro)/Challenges to Quitting Cigarettes" – 1:02
 "Lion" – 5:15
 "Dance of the Inhabitants of the Palace of King Philip XIV of Spain" – 5:32
 "View East from the B&O Railroad Viaduct and the Riggs Road/B&O Trestle" – 5:38
 "On the Sunny Side of the Ocean" – 3:31
 "The Great Santa Barbara Oil Slick" – 6:37
 "In Christ There Is No East or West" (Harry Burleigh, John Oxenham) –2:48
 "Announcement" – 0:40
 "The Death of the Clayton Peacock" – 4:35
 "The Revolt of the Dyke Brigade" – 4:01
 "Magruder Park" – 9:52

Personnel
John Fahey – guitar
Production notes
Glenn Jones – producer, liner notes
Dean Blackwood – associate producer
Filippo Salvadori – executive producer
Marcello Azevedo – mastering
Nathan Russell – design
Jim Anderson – photography
Melissa Stephenson – photography
Janet Hayes – photography

References

John Fahey (musician) live albums
2004 live albums